These are the official results of the men's decathlon competition at the 1983 World Championships in Helsinki, Finland. There were a total number of 25 participating athletes, including seven non-finishers. The competition was held from August 12 to August 13, 1983.

Medalists

Schedule

Friday August 12

Saturday August 13

Records

Results

See also
 1980 Men's Olympic Decathlon (Moscow)
 1982 Men's European Championships Decathlon (Athens)
 1984 Men's Olympic Decathlon (Los Angeles)

References
 Results

D
Decathlon at the World Athletics Championships